The 1975 Major League Baseball All-Star Game was the 46th midseason exhibition between the all-stars of the American League (AL) and the National League (NL), the two leagues comprising Major League Baseball. The game was played on July 15, 1975, at Milwaukee County Stadium in Milwaukee, Wisconsin, home of the Milwaukee Brewers of the American League. The game resulted in a 6–3 victory for the NL.

While this was the first time that the Brewers were acting as hosts of the All-Star Game, this was not the first time the game had been played at Milwaukee County Stadium.  The 1955 game had been played there when the Braves had called Milwaukee home.  Thus, Milwaukee County Stadium joined Sportsman's Park in St. Louis and Shibe Park in Philadelphia as the only stadiums to host All-Star Games with two different franchises as host.

This would also be the last time Milwaukee County Stadium would host the game.  When the game returned to Milwaukee in 2002, the Brewers had moved into their new home at Miller Park.

The 1975 All-Star Game saw the start of the tradition of naming honorary captains to the All-Star teams.  The first honorary captains were Mickey Mantle (for the AL) and Stan Musial (for the NL).

It would also mark the final All-Star Game in which only "The Star-Spangled Banner", sung this year by Glen Campbell, was performed prior to the game. Beginning the following year, "O Canada" would also be performed as part of the All-Star pregame ceremonies.

National League roster 
The National League roster included 8 future Hall of Fame players, denoted in italics.

Elected starters

Pitchers

Reserve position players

Coaching staff

American League roster 
The American League roster included 9 future Hall of Fame players, denoted in italics.

Elected starters

Pitchers

Reserve position players

Coaching staff

Starting lineups 
While the starters were elected by the fans, the batting orders and starting pitchers were selected by the managers.

Umpires

Scoring summary 
The National League took a 2–0 lead in the top of the second off of AL starter Vida Blue when Steve Garvey and Jimmy Wynn led off the inning by hitting back-to-back home runs.

The NL added another run in the top of the third, this time off of new AL relief pitcher Steve Busby.  Lou Brock opened the inning with a single.  With Joe Morgan batting, Busby balked, sending Brock to second base.  After Morgan flew out, Johnny Bench came to bat, during which, Brock stole third base.  Bench singled, scoring Brock from third base to give the NL a 3–0 lead.

The AL did not respond until the bottom of the sixth inning.  Tom Seaver had just entered the game as the NL's relief pitcher.  Joe Rudi led off with a single, and was immediately replaced for pinch runner George Hendrick.  With Graig Nettles batting, Hendrick stole second base.  After Nettles struck out, Gene Tenace walked.  Carl Yastrzemski pinch hit for Jim Kaat, and hit a home run, scoring Hendrick and Tenace to tie the score.

AL pitcher Catfish Hunter was entering his third inning of relief work when the NL closed out the scoring in the top of the ninth.  Reggie Smith singled.  Al Oliver, pinch hitting for Jon Matlack, doubled, sending Smith to third base.  Catfish Hunter was replaced by relief pitcher Goose Gossage.  The next batter, Larry Bowa, was hit by a pitch, and went to first base, loading the bases.  Bill Madlock singled, scoring Smith and Oliver, sending Bowa to third base, and advancing himself to second base on a Gene Tenace throwing error.  Pete Rose hit a sacrifice fly, scoring Bowa, sending Madlock to third base, and securing a 6–3 win for the National League.

Line score

Game notes and records 
Jon Matlack was credited with the win.  Catfish Hunter was charged with the loss.

This was Hank Aaron's 25th and final All-Star Game.  It was his first and only appearance for the American League squad, and came in the former home of the Milwaukee Braves, the first Major League team for which he had played.

Notes

References

External links
1975 All-Star Game summary @baseball-reference.com
 1975 All-Star Game summary @baseball almanac.com
 1975 All-Star Game box score @baseball almanac.com
 1975 All-Star Game play-by-play @baseball almanac.com

All-Star Game
1975
1975
Major League Baseball All Star Game
1975
July 1975 sports events in the United States